James Scott Sutherland (10 May 1900 - 31 May 1973) was an Australian rules footballer who played with South Melbourne in the Victorian Football League (VFL).

Notes

External links 

1900 births
1973 deaths
Australian rules footballers from Victoria (Australia)
Sydney Swans players